Alessandro Mahmoud (born 12 September 1992), known professionally as Mahmood, is an Italian singer-songwriter. He rose to prominence after competing on the sixth season of the Italian version of The X Factor. He has won the Sanremo Music Festival twice, in 2019 with the song "Soldi" and in 2022 alongside Blanco with the song "Brividi".

Mahmood has released two studio albums, Gioventù bruciata and Ghettolimpo, both of which reached the top two of the Italian albums chart.

Early life
Born in Milan to an Egyptian father and a Sardinian mother from Orosei, Mahmood was raised around Gratosoglio, a district of Milan. When he was five years old, his parents divorced and he was subsequently raised by his mother.

Career

2012–2018: X Factor and beginnings
In 2012, Mahmood auditioned for the sixth season of the Italian version of The X Factor. He became part of the boys category mentored by Simona Ventura. He was originally eliminated at Judges Houses, then returned as a wildcard, before eventually being eliminated in the third episode. After this experience, he worked in a bar and attended a music school, studying piano, solfeggio and music theory, where he also started writing songs. In 2013, he released his debut single "Fallin' Rain".

In 2016, Mahmood participated in the Newcomers Section of Sanremo Music Festival with the song "Dimentica". In 2017, he released the single "Pesos", with which he participates in the fifth edition of the Wind Summer Festival, winning the third episode of the Youth section. In 2017, he was also featured on Fabri Fibra's single "Luna". In September 2018, he released his debut extended play, Gioventù bruciata. In November 2018, Marco Mengoni released his fifth album, Atlantico, which features three tracks co-written by Mahmood, including the single "Hola (I Say)".

2018–2020: Gioventù bruciata, Sanremo and Eurovision

In December 2018, Mahmood was one of 24 acts selected to compete in Sanremo Giovani, a televised competition aimed at selecting two newcomers as contestants of the 69th Sanremo Music Festival. Mahmood was placed first in the second episode of the show, with his entry "Gioventù bruciata", also receiving the Critics' Award among acts performing in the second final. "Soldi" was later announced as his entry for the Sanremo Music Festival 2019.

Mahmood performed the song for the first time during the first live show of the 69th Sanremo Music Festival, which was held on 5 February 2019. Dario "Dardust" Faini, co-writer of the song, directed the Sanremo Orchestra during his performance. During the third live show, "Soldi" was the first performance of the night. On 8 February 2019, Mahmood performed the song in a new version, featuring rapper Gué Pequeno. During the first round of the final, "Soldi" placed 7th in the televote, but was the most voted by the experts jury, and the second most voted by the press jury. As a result, Mahmood gained a spot in the top three acts of the competition and after an additional performance, the song was declared the winner of the 69th Sanremo Music Festival.
Mahmood also received the "Enzo Jannacci" Award for Best Performance. and the "Premio Baglioni d'oro" award for best song voted by the participating artists.

On 22 February 2019, Mahmood reissued Gioventù bruciata as a full-length studio album, which topped the Italian albums chart. In April 2019, Mahmood was featured on the single "Calipso" by Charlie Charles and Dardust, which topped the Italian singles chart. In May 2019, he represented Italy at the Eurovision Song Contest 2019 in Tel Aviv, Israel. He performed "Soldi" in the grand final of the contest on 18 May, placing second in the final ranking. The song topped the charts in Greece, Israel, Italy and Lithuania and reached the top 10 in five more countries, eventually becoming the most-streamed Eurovision song ever on Spotify, a record held until late January 2021 when it was surpassed by the 2019 Eurovision winner, "Arcade" by Duncan Laurence. Mahmood performed at the closing ceremony of the 2019 Summer Universiade in Naples with three of his songs "Soldi", "Gioventù bruciata" and "Anni 90".

2020–present: Ghettolimpo, return to Sanremo and Eurovision 
On 11 June 2021, Mahmood released his second studio album, Ghettolimpo. The album's release was preceded by five singles: "Rapide", "Dorado" (in collaboration with fellow Italian rapper Sfera Ebbasta and Colombian singer Feid), "Inuyasha", "Zero" (also included in the soundtrack of the 2021 Netflix series of the same name) and "Klan".

Mahmood made his return to Sanremo in 2022 alongside Blanco with the song "Brividi", with which they won and thus earned the right to represent  at the Eurovision Song Contest 2022 in Turin.
The song reached number 15 on the Billboard Global 200 chart dated 19 February 2022. At the contest in Turin, "Brividi" finished in sixth place with 268 points.

Public image
Mahmood is a portmanteau of Alessandro's surname Mahmoud and the English expression my mood. Despite his father's origins, Mahmood does not speak Arabic but is fluent in Sardinian. Following his Sanremo win, then Deputy Prime Minister Matteo Salvini, who is known for his anti-immigrant views, criticized him for winning over Ultimo who received the highest number of public votes.

Mahmood has an aversion to being categorized by his nationality or sexuality. He has stated that "declaring 'I'm gay' leads nowhere" and "If we continue with these distinctions, homosexuality will never be perceived as a normal thing, which it is". When speaking in favour of a proposed law against homophobic and transphobic hate crimes, he described having been subjected to homophobic bullying during his schooling. According to Italian press, while he has refused to answer the question of whether he's gay, he has stated that he's "happy and taken".

He considers himself Christian and, more specifically, Roman Catholic, despite disagreeing with the Catholic Church's teaching that homosexual acts are "gravely sinful".

In 2019, he was named to the Italian Forbes 30 Under 30, a list showcasing entrepreneurs, entertainers and celebrities who have made a name for themselves before reaching the age of 30.

Artistry
Mahmood has described his music as Moroccan pop. According to him "what sets me apart are the Middle Eastern sounds that emerge here and there". "Soldi", which is an autobiographic song about his "unconventional family", includes a sentence in Arabic. One of his earliest musical memories is listening to Arabic music with his father, before he left the family. Growing up he also listened to Italian artists like Lucio Battisti, Lucio Dalla and Paolo Conte. He considers himself very linked to Sardinia's culture and folklore, which often acts as a source of inspiration for the composition of his songs.

Mahmood has cited American singer Frank Ocean as his biggest influence: "[His music] is very free and in which everyone can identify themselves, gay or straight, because the essential is the person and the energy that he transmits and not the sexual orientation". His other favorite artists include  Beyoncé, Travis Scott, Jazmine Sullivan, Rosalía and SZA.

Discography

Studio albums
Gioventù bruciata (2019)
Ghettolimpo (2021)

Author and songwriter for other artists 
Mahmood has written and composed songs with many Italian songwriters and producers, including Francesco Catitti, Dardust, Charlie Charles, Alessandro Raina, and artists such as Marracash, Chiara, Marco Mengoni, Fabri Fibra, Elodie and Michele Bravi.
In 2019, thanks to his victory at the Sanremo Music Festival, Mogol offered the artist a scholarship to improve his skills as a songwriter at the European Centre in Toscolano for authors, composers and artists.

Awards and nominations

References

External links 

1992 births
Living people
Singers from Milan
Italian people of Egyptian descent
Italian pop singers
X Factor (Italian TV series) contestants
Sanremo Music Festival winners
21st-century Italian male singers
MTV Europe Music Award winners
Eurovision Song Contest entrants of 2019
Eurovision Song Contest entrants of 2022
Eurovision Song Contest entrants for Italy
Italian Roman Catholics
Italian people of Sardinian descent
Universal Music Group artists